Flavigny is a commune in the Cher department in the Centre-Val de Loire region of France.

Geography
The river Airain forms all of the commune's western border.

Population

Sights
 The twelfth-century church of St. Germain.
 The Chateau de Bar, dating from the fifteenth century.

See also
Communes of the Cher department

References

Communes of Cher (department)